The Finnish Air Force UFO sighting ("The seven balloons of Pori") was a UFO observation on April 12, 1969 in Pori during military training exercises. It has the distinction of being the only UFO observation acknowledged by the Finnish Air Force, who suggested that it may have been due to foreign reconnaissance aircraft.

Sighting 
During a Fouga Magister jet training mission at Pori Airport on April 12, 1969, a Finnish Defence Forces flight controller told pilot-in-training Tarmo Tukeva to investigate seven air balloons that were floating at approximately 1500-3000 meters above the airport. Tukeva reported that the objects were ball or disc shaped, but could not determine his distance to them. According to Tukeva, the objects accelerated away from him “at great speed”. Undetermined radar images were also later reported 200 kilometers away in Vaasa. A second pilot-in-training, Jouko Kuronen, says he overheard the radio communications between the flight controller and Tukeva as well as observing the objects. According to the Finnish Armed Forces magazine Ruotuväki, the April 12 reports were similar to other cases occurring over bodies of water during ongoing military exercises, and may have been due to "transnational spy planes or aircraft".

References 

Pori
1969 in Finland
Alleged UFO-related aviation incidents
UFO-related phenomena
Finnish Air Force